In America is the third compilation album by saxophonist Kenny G. It was released by Jazz Door in 2001.

Track listing
"The Shuffle"
"Midnight Motion"
"Hi, How Ya Doin'?"
"Pastel"
"Slip of the Tongue"
"Songbird / Solo"
"What Does It Take"
"Nightime in Tribeca"

References

Kenny G compilation albums
2001 compilation albums
Arista Records compilation albums